Enteromius profundus is a species of ray-finned fish in the genus Enteromius which is endemic to Lake Victoria where it was severely reduced by non native fishes but has recovered and is now regarded as not endangered.

References 

 

Enteromius
Taxa named by Humphry Greenwood
Fish described in 1970